Robert L. Bednarski (April 5, 1944 – February 22, 2004) was an American heavyweight weightlifter. He set 12 world record in 1968–69 and won three medals at the world championships, including a gold in 1969.

Career
During his career, Bednarski won five national championships and set 12 ratified world records. He was relatively small for heavyweight weightlifter and relied on his agility. In 1966, he placed second at the world championships, but during the 1967 Pan American Games suffered a career-threatening elbow injury. He recovered, and the next year set two world records at the national championships. At the 1968 US Olympic Trials he placed third, and was not selected for the Olympic team. He won the world title the next year, and placed third in 1970. In December 1969, Bednarski and three other weightlifters associated with the 1968 Summer Olympics met with President Richard Nixon for seven minutes at the White House along with Pennsylvania congressman George Atlee Goodling. In 1983, he was inducted into the United States Weightlifting Federation Hall of Fame.

Family
Bednarski was born in Hartford, Connecticut, to parents John and Helen, and had three brothers, John, Gary, and Richard, and three sisters, Judie Valois, Carol Ferrelli, and Brenda Paris. He was married to Kathy (Gacek) for 29 years. They had a son Bobby and a daughter Sheryl. Bednarski loved animals, and had three poodles.

Legacy
The Barksi Snatch is named after Bednarski, a challenging movement that includes  snatching the weight three times from the hip without dropping the bar or using the assistance of straps around the hands.

References

External links
Bob Bednarski – Hall of Fame at Weightlifting Exchange

American male weightlifters
1944 births
2004 deaths
World Weightlifting Championships medalists
20th-century American people
21st-century American people